A list of British films released in 2010.

See also
 2010 in film
 2010 in British music
 2010 in British radio
 2010 in British television
 2010 in the United Kingdom
 List of 2010 box office number-one films in the United Kingdom

References

External links

2010
Films
Lists of 2010 films by country or language

ja:2009年のイギリスの映画作品一覧